This is a list of alleged sightings of unidentified flying objects or UFOs in Iran.

1976 

 The 1976 Tehran UFO Incident was a radar and visual sighting of an unidentified flying object (UFO) over Tehran, the capital of Iran. The incident is particularly notable for the electromagnetic interference effects on aircraft near the UFO. Two F-4 jet interceptors independently lost instrumentation and communications as they approached, only to have these restored when they left. One F-4 also lost its weapons systems when it was about to fire on the object. The incident is well documented in a U.S. Defense Intelligence Agency (DIA) report with a distribution list that included the White House, Secretary of State, Joint Chiefs of Staff, National Security Agency (NSA), and Central Intelligence Agency (CIA). Various high-ranking Iranian military officers directly involved with the events have also gone on public record stating their belief the object was an extraterrestrial craft.

1982
 At night of summer 1982 in Isfahan, a large reflection of an object (UFO?) was seen by thousands of people in the sky.

2003 
 In August 2003, two tourists saw a couple of yellow-white colored UFOs near the Caspian Sea.

2004 
 In April, of 2004, a mass UFO sighting (known as the 2004 Iran UFO sighting) occurred between April 12–21. The UFOs were sighted by thousands of people and one was filmed by Iranian TV. It is unclear if the objects sighted were UFOs or if they were surveillance aircraft or the planet Venus.  Many photos of UFOs in Iran surfaced shortly during the UFO sighting. Many of the photos were deemed unknown by some UFO groups but written off as either hoaxes, conventional aircraft or the planet Venus.

2005 
 A tourist said that he saw a UFO hovering near the Tomb of Cyrus the Great.

2007 

 Eyewitnesses told the Fars News Agency (FNA) that a radiant UFO had crashed in the Barez Mounts of Kerman on Wednesday morning.  Abulghassem Nasrollahi, the Deputy General of the Kerman province in Iran told the news agency that all the aircraft in the area had been accounted for, but did not rule out the possibility that the object could be a meteor.  Another source also told the FNA that the object was on fire with thick smoke coming from it, and claimed that this implied the object was not a meteor. However, meteors appear as bright fireballs in the sky, as they are heated to high temperatures due largely to ram pressure as they fall at high speeds through the Earth's atmosphere. Meteors often burn up completely before reaching the ground and some leave a smoke-like trail in their wake.  Abulghassem noted that a few days earlier, in Rafsanjan, a similar incident was reported by witnesses.

References 

Historical events in Iran
Iran